Arunachalesvara Temple (also called Annamalaiyar Temple) is a Hindu temple dedicated to the deity Shiva, located at the base of Arunachala hill in the town of Thiruvannamalai in Tamil Nadu, India. It is significant to the Hindu sect of Shaivism as one of the temples associated with the five elements, the Pancha Bhoota Stalas, and specifically the element of fire, or Agni.  

Shiva is worshiped as Arunachalesvara or Annamalaiyar, and is represented by the lingam, with his idol referred to as Agni lingam. His consort Parvati is depicted as Unnamalai Amman or Apithakucha Ambal. The presiding deity is revered in the 7th-century Tamil Saiva canonical work, the Tevaram, written by Tamil saint poets known as the nayanars and classified as Paadal Petra Sthalam. The 9th-century Saiva saint poet Manikkavasagar composed the Tiruvempaavai here.

The temple complex covers 10 hectares, and is one of the largest in India. It houses four gateway towers known as gopurams. The temple complex houses many halls; the most notable is the thousand-pillared hall built during the Vijayanagar period.

The present masonry structure was built during the Chola dynasty in the 9th century, while later expansions are attributed to Vijayanagara rulers of the Sangama Dynasty (1336–1485 CE), the Saluva Dynasty and the Tuluva Dynasty (1491–1570 CE). The temple is maintained and administered by the Hindu Religious and Charitable Endowments Department of the Government of Tamil Nadu.

The temple has six daily rituals at various times from 5:30 a.m. to 10 p.m., and twelve yearly festivals on its calendar. The Karthigai Deepam festival is celebrated during the day of the full moon between November and December, and a huge beacon is lit atop the hill.  It can be seen from miles around, and symbolizes the Shiva lingam of fire joining the sky. The event is witnessed by three million pilgrims. On the day preceding each full moon, pilgrims circumnavigate the temple base and the Arunachala hills in a worship called Girivalam, a practice carried out by one million pilgrims yearly.

The western world learnt of Tiruvannamalai during the mid 20th century, through the work of Ramana Maharishi (1879–1950 CE).

Legend

In Hindu mythology, Parvati, wife of Shiva, once closed the eyes of her husband playfully in a flower garden at their abode atop Mount Kailash. Although only a moment for the gods, all light was taken from the universe, and the earth, in turn, was submerged in darkness for years. Parvati performed penance along with other devotees of Shiva. Then her husband appeared as a huge column of fire at the top of Annamalai hills, returning light to the world. He then merged with Parvati to form Ardhanarishvara, the half-female, half-male form of Shiva. The Arunachala, or red mountain, lies behind the Arunachalesvara temple, and is associated with the temple of its namesake. The hill itself is sacred and considered a lingam, or an iconic representation of Shiva.

Another legend is that once, while Vishnu and Brahma contested for superiority, Shiva appeared as a flame, and challenged them to find his source. Brahma took the form of a swan, and flew to the sky to see the top of the flame, while Vishnu became the boar Varaha, and sought its base. The scene is called Lingodbhava, and is represented in the western wall at the sanctum of most Shiva temples. Neither Brahma nor Vishnu could find the source even.

History

Ancient Tamil scholars such as Nakkirar (1st century BCE to 1st century CE), Kapilar and Paranar (125 to 225 CE) have referred to the shrine at Annamalai and the presiding deity.  The 7th-century Nayanar saints Sambandar and Appar wrote of the temple in their poetic work, Tevaram. Sekkizhar, the author of the Periyapuranam wrote that both Appar and Sambandar worshiped Arunachalesvara in the temple. The Chola Kings ruled over the region for more than four centuries, from 850 CE to 1280 CE, and were temple patrons. The inscriptions from the Chola king record various gifts like land, sheep, cow and oil to the temple commemorating various victories of the dynasty. The Hoysala kings used Tiruvannamalai as their capital beginning in 1328 CE. There are 48 inscriptions from the Sangama Dynasty (1336–1485 CE), 2 inscriptions from Saluva Dynasty, and 55 inscriptions from Tuluva Dynasty (1491–1570 CE) of the Vijayanagara Empire, reflecting gifts to the temple from their rulers. There are also inscriptions from the rule of Krishnadeva Raya (1509–1529 CE), the most powerful Vijayanagara king, indicating further patronage. Most of the Vijayanagara inscriptions were written in Tamil, with some in Kannada and Sanskrit. The inscriptions in temple from the Vijayanagara kings indicate emphasis on administrative matters and local concerns, which contrasts the inscriptions of the same rulers in other temples like Tirupathi. The majority of the gift related inscriptions are for land endowments, followed by goods, cash endowments, cows and oil for lighting lamps. The town of Tiruvannamalai was at a strategic crossroads during the Vijayanagara Empire, connecting sacred centers of pilgrimage and military routes. There are inscriptions that show the area as an urban center before the precolonial period, with the city developing around the temple.

During the 17th century CE, the temple along with the Tiruvannamalai town came under the dominion of the Nawab of the Carnatic. As the Mughal empire came to an end, the Nawab lost control of the town, with confusion and chaos ensuing after 1753. Subsequently, there were periods of both Hindu and Muslim stewardship of the temple, with Muraru Raya, Krishna Raya, Mrithis Ali Khan, and Burkat Ullakhan besieging the temple in succession. As European incursions progressed, Tiruvannamalai was attacked by French Soupries, Sambrinet, and the English Captain Stephen Smith. While some were repelled, others were victorious. The French occupied the town in 1757, and the temple along with the town came under control of the British in 1760. In 1790 CE, Tiruvannamalai town was captured by Tippu Sultan, who ruled from 1750 to 1799 CE. During the first half of the 19th century, the town along with the temple came under British rule. From 1951, under the provision of the Hindu Religious and Charitable Endowments Act, the temple has been maintained by the Hindu Religious and Charitable Endowments Department (HR & CE) of the Government of Tamil Nadu. In 2002, the Archaeological Survey of India declared the temple a national heritage monument and took over its stewardship. Widespread protests and litigation with the Supreme Court of India, however, led the Archaeological Survey to cede the temple back to the Hindu Religious and Endowment Board.

Architecture

Complex and towers

The temple is situated at the bottom of the Arunachala hills, and faces east, lying over 25 acres. The walls on the east and west measure , the south , and the north . The present masonry and towers date back to the 9th century CE, as seen from an inscription in the structure made by Chola kings who ruled at that time. Further inscriptions indicate that before the 9th century, Tiruvannamalai was under the Pallava Kings, who ruled from Kanchipuram. It has four gateway towers, the gopuram, on its four sides. The eastern tower, the Rajagopuram, is the tallest in the temple. It was begun by king Krishnadevaraya (1509–29 CE) of the Vijayanagara dynasty, and completed by Sevappa Nayaka (1532–80 CE). The inscriptions indicate that the tower was built at the behest of Sivanesa and his brother Lokanatha in 1572 CE. The south tower is called Thirumanjangopuram, and the west tower is called Pe Gopuram. Ammani Amman gourami in the north. Raghunathabhyudayam and Sangitha Sudha, both Nayak scriptures, also describe the towers. The Tanjavuri Andhra Raja Charitamu mentions that Krishnadevaraya built the tower and the outer precincts of the temple. The temple has a total of five precincts, each of which holds a huge Nandi, the sacred bull of Shiva. Towers include the Vallala Maharaja Gopuram and Kili Gopuram, or Parrot Tower.

Shrines
The main shrine of Arunachalesvara faces east, housing images of Nandi and Surya, and is the oldest structure in the temple. Behind the walls of the sanctum, there is an image of Venugopalaswamy (Krishna), an incarnation of Vishnu.  Around the sanctum, there are images of Somaskanda, Durga, Chandeshvara, Gajalakshmi, Arumugaswami (Kartikeya), Dakshinamurthy, Swarnabairavar, Nataraja, and Lingodbhava—the last an image of Shiva emanating from lingam. The Palliyarai, the divine room for resting deities, is located at the first precinct around the sanctum. The shrine of his consort, Annamalai Amman, lies in the second precinct, with Amman depicted in a standing posture. Sambantha Vinayagar (Ganesha), is located to the north of the flagstaff and the Bali peeta, or platform for sacrifice.  To the south of the thousand-pillared hall, there is a small shrine for Subramanya (Kartikeya) and a large tank. Pathala Lingam, the underground lingam, is the place where Ramana Maharshi (1879–1950 CE) is believed to have performed his penance. The shrine of Sivagangai Vinayagar (Ganesha) is present in the northern bank of the Sivanganga tank.

Halls

There is a sixteen-pillared Deepa Darshana Mandapam, or hall of light, in the third precinct. The temple tree, Magizha, is considered sacred and medicinal, and childless couples tie small cradles to its branches in obeisance. Vedas write that the mast of the temple separated the earth and the sky during creation of the universe. The Kalyana Mandapam, the marriage hall, is in the south-west of the precinct, and is built in Vijayanagara style. A stone trident is present in the outer shrine of the temple in open air, and has protective railings like a sacred tree.  The Vasantha Mandapam, meaning the Hall of spring, is the third precinct, and contains the temple office and Kalahateeswarar shrine. The fourth precinct has an image of Nandi, Brahma Theertham, the temple tank, the Yanai Thirai Konda Vinayaga shrine, and a hall with a six-foot-tall statue of Nandi, erected by Vallala Maharaja.

Inside the doorway of the first tower and the fifth precinct, there is a thousand-pillared hall built during the late Vijayanagara period. Krishnadevaraya constructed the hall and dug the tank opposite to it.  The pillars in the hall are carved with images of yali, a mythological beast with body of lion and head of an elephant, a symbol of Nayak power. The Arunagirinathar Mandapam is located to the right of the Kalayana Linga Sundara Eswara Mandapam, and the Gopurathilayanar shrine is to the left of a broad flight of stone stairs that lead up to the Vallala Gopuram.

Worship and festivals

The temple priests perform the pooja (rituals) during festivals and on a daily basis. Like other Shiva temples of Tamil Nadu, the priests belong to the Shaivaite Brahmin caste. The temple rituals are performed by pandit six times a day; Ushatkalam at 5:30 a.m., Kalashanti at 8:00 a.m., Uchikalam at 10:00 a.m., Sayarakshai at 6:00 p.m., Irandamkalam at 8:00 p.m. and Arddha Jamam at 10:00 p.m. Each ritual comprises four steps: abhishekam (sacred bath), alankaram (decoration), naivedyam (food offering) and deepa aradhanai (waving of lamps) for both Arunachaleshvara and Unnamulai Amman. The worship is held amidst music with nagaswaram (pipe instrument) and tavil (percussion instrument), religious instructions in the Vedas read by priests and prostration by worshippers in front of the temple mast.

The temple celebrates dozens of festivals throughout the year. Four prime festivals, the Brahmotsavam, are celebrated yearly. The most important of these lasts ten days during the Tamil month of Karthikai, between November and December, concluding with the celebration of Karthikai Deepam.  A huge lamp is lit in a cauldron, containing three tons of ghee, at the top of the Arunachala hills during the Deepam. To mark the occasion, the festival image of Arunachalesvara is taken around the wooden chariot around the mountain. Inscriptions indicate that the festival was celebrated as early as the Chola period (from 850 CE to 1280 CE) and was expanded to ten days in the twentieth century.

Every full moon, tens of thousands of pilgrims worship Arunachalesvara by circumambulating the Arunachala hill barefoot. According to Hindu legend, the walk removes sins, fulfils desires and helps achieve freedom from the cycle of birth and rebirth. Offerings are made in a string of tanks, shrines, pillared meditation halls, springs and caves around the hill. The circumambulation continues during the rest of the month. On the day of yearly Chitra Pournami, the full moon of the Tamil calendar, hundreds of thousands of pilgrims come from across the world to worship Arunachalesvara. Five temple cars, called ther, with wooden carvings, are used for the procession.

Tiruvoodal is another festival celebrated during the first week of the Tamil month Thai at mid-January of every year. On the morning of Maatu Pongal, between 15 and 16 January, Nandi is decorated with garlands made of fruits, vegetables and sweets.  The festival deities of Arunachalesvara and Unnamamulai Amman are taken out of the temple to Tiruoodal street to enact the oodal (or love tiff) between the two in the evening.

Religious significance
The Arunachalesvara temple is one of the Pancha Bhoota Stalams, or five Shiva temples, with each a manifestation of a natural element: earth, water, air, sky and fire. In Arunachalesvara temple, Shiva is said to have manifested himself as a massive column of fire, whose crown and feet could not be found by the Hindu gods, Brahma and Vishnu. The main lingam in the shrine is referred as Agni Lingam, and represents duty, virtue, self-sacrifice and liberation through ascetic life at the end of the Agni kalpa.

Aathara Stala are Shiva temples which are considered to be personifications of the Tantric chakras of human anatomy. The Arunachalesvara temple is called the Manipooraga stalam, and is associated with the Manipooraga (Manipura) chakra. Manipooraga is the chakra associated with the solar plexus.

Saints and literary mention
Tirugnana Sambandar, a 7th-century Tamil Saivite poet, venerated Arunachalesvara and Unnamulai Amman in ten verses in Tevaram, compiled as the First Tirumurai.  Appar, a contemporary of Sambandar, also venerated Arunachalesvara in 10 verses in Tevaram, compiled as the Fifth Tirumurai. As the temple is revered in Tevaram, it is classified as Paadal Petra Sthalam, one of the 276 temples that find mention in the Saiva canon.

Manickavasagar, a 9th-century Tamil saint and poet, revered Arunachalesvara in his writing, describing the deity as "AnnAmalai". He composed the Thiruvempavai in the Tamil month of Margazhi at the temple. Arunagirinathar was a 15th-century Tamil poet born in Tiruvannamalai. He spent his early years as a rioter and seducer of women. After ruining his health, he tried to commit suicide by throwing himself from the northern tower, but was saved by the grace of god Murugan (Kartikeya). He became a staunch devotee and composed Tamil hymns glorifying Murugan, the most notable being Thirupugazh.

The western world learnt of Tiruvannamalai during the mid 20th century, through the work of Ramana Maharishi (1879–1950 CE). The cave where Ramana meditated is on the lower slopes of the Arunachala hills, with the ashram further down at the foothills. The basement of the raised hall inside the temple has the Patala Lingam, where Ramana attained supreme awareness while ants devoured his flesh. The place is also called a Mukthi Sthalam, meaning place of salvation, and saints like Seshadri Swamigal, Gugai Namachivayar and Yogi Ramsuratkumar have been associated with the temple.

See also
 List of tallest structures built before the 20th century

Notes

References

 
 
 
 
 
 
 
 
 
 
 .
 .
 .
 .
 
 .
 .
 .
 .
 .
 .
 .
 .
 .
 .
 .
 .
 .
 .
 .
 
 .
 .
 .
 .
 
 .
 .
 .
 .

External links

 Temple Official website 

 

Pancha Bhoota Stalam
Padal Petra Stalam
Tiruvannamalai
Chola architecture
Dravidian architecture
Shiva temples in Tiruvannamalai district
Temples with Bharatanatyam Karanas